The bulbospongiosus muscle (in older texts bulbocavernosus and, for female muscle, constrictor cunni) is one of the superficial muscles of the perineum.  It has a slightly different origin, insertion and function in males and females.  In males, it covers the bulb of the penis.  In females, it covers the vestibular bulb.

In both sexes, it is innervated by the deep or muscular branch of the perineal nerve, which is a branch of the pudendal nerve.

Structure
In males, the bulbospongiosus is located in the middle line of the perineum, in front of the anus. It consists of two symmetrical parts, united along the median line by a tendinous perineal raphe. It arises from the central tendinous point of the perineum and from the median perineal raphe in front.

In females, there is no union, nor a tendinous perineal raphe; the parts are disjoint primarily and arise from the same central tendinous point of the perineum, which is the tendon that is formed at the point where the bulbospongiosus muscle, superficial transverse perineal muscle, and external anal sphincter muscle converge to form this major supportive structure of vagina and other organs, and from the clitoris in front.

Fibers
Its fibers diverge; the most posterior form a thin layer, which is lost on the inferior fascia of the urogenital diaphragm; the middle fibers encircle the bulb and adjacent parts, of the corpus cavernosum urethrae, and join with the fibers of the opposite side, on the upper part of the corpus cavernosum urethrae, in a strong aponeurosis; the anterior fibers, spread out over the side of the corpus cavernosum penis, to be inserted partly into that body, anterior to the Ischiocavernosus, occasionally extending to the pubis, and partly ending in a tendinous expansion which covers the dorsal vessels of the penis.

The latter fibers are best seen by dividing the muscle longitudinally, and reflecting it from the surface of the corpus cavernosum urethra.

Function
In males it contributes to erection,  the contractions of orgasm and ejaculation.   In females it contributes to clitoral erection and the contractions of orgasm, and closes the vagina.

This muscle serves to empty the canal of the urethra, after the bladder has expelled its contents; during the greater part of the act of micturition its fibers are relaxed, and it only comes into action at the end of the process.

The middle fibers are supposed by Krause to assist in the erection of the corpus spongiosum, by compressing the erectile tissue of the bulb.

The anterior fibers also contribute to the erection of the penis by compressing the deep dorsal vein of the penis as they are inserted into, and continuous with, the fascia of the penis.

Gallery

References

External links

 —"Muscles of the male superficial perineal pouch."
 —"The Female Perineum: Muscles of the Superficial Perineal Pouch"
 —"The urinary bladder and the urethra as seen in a frontal section of the female pelvis."
 
 

Muscles of the torso
Perineum